Queen Cheorin (27 April 1837 – 12 June 1878), of the Andong Kim clan, was queen consort of Joseon by marriage to King Cheoljong. She was known as Queen Dowager Myeongsun (명순대비) after the death of her husband and during King Gojong's reign. When King Gojong proclaimed the Korean Empire, the Queen was posthumously given the title of "Cheorin, the Symbolic Empress" (철인장황후, 哲仁章皇后).

Biography

Early life and marriage 
Lady Kim was born into the (new) Andong Kim clan (Hangul: 신 안동 김씨; Hanja: 新 安東 金氏) on 27 April 1837 as the eldest daughter of Kim Mun-geun (Hangul: 김문근; Hanja: 金汶根) and his second wife, Lady Min of the Yeoheung Min clan. She had one younger brother.

Lady Kim was not usually close to her parents or family, was known to be a woman of a few words, and did not easily reveal her feelings to those around her.

As part of the Andong Kim clan's manipulation of King Cheoljong through Queen Sunwon, the 14-year-old Lady Kim married the 20-year-old King Cheoljong on November 17, 1851. As queen, it is said that she was not involved and did not side with her family in royal politics as she kept to herself.

As the parents of the Queen consort, Lady Min received the royal title of “Internal Princess Consort Heungyang of the Yeoheung Min clan” (Hangul: 흥양부부인 여흥 민씨; Hanja: 興陽府夫人 驪興 閔氏). While her father received the royal title of “Internal Prince Yeongeun” (Hangul: 영은부원군, Hanja: 永恩府院君). Her father's first wife, Lady Yi, also received the royal title of “Internal Princess Consort Yeonyang of the Yeonan Yi clan” (연양부부인 연안 이씨, 延陽府夫人 延安 金氏) as she was also considered the mother of Lady Kim.

The Queen eventually gave birth to a son, Prince Royal Yi Yung-jun on 22 November 1858, but he died 6 months and 3 days later on  25 May 1859.

As Cheoljong fell deeper under his illness, the Grand Royal Queen Dowager Sinjeong saw an opportunity to advance the cause of the Pungyang Jo clan (the only true rival of the Andong Kim clan).

Life as queen dowager and later life 
The 33-year-old King Cheoljong died on 16 January 1864 within Daejojeon Hall in Changdeok Palace. The cause of his death is ambiguous, as there was no clear official record about it. Some suggested that the death of cause of Cheoljong could be liver disease or tuberculosis; according to existing documents, however, it is still hard to give a certain conclusion to date.

According to Ilseongnok ("Diary of Self-examination"), since Cheoljong ascended to the throne, he had a weak digestive system, causing a series of chronic disease throughout his life; Cheoljong also had symptoms of asthma and caught cold quite easily. Thus leaving the throne vacant and in need of an heir. 

The selection of the next king was in the hands of three dowagers: Queen Dowager Hyoyu, the widow of Crown Prince Hyomyeong and mother of King Heonjong, Queen Dowager Myeongheon, the widow of King Heonjong, and Queen Dowager Myeongsun, King Cheoljong's wife.

Queen Dowager Hyoyu was approached by Yi Ha-eung, a descendant of King Injo (r. 1623–1649), whose father was made an adoptive son of Prince Eunsin, a nephew of King Yeongjo (r. 1724–1776). Yi Ha-eung's family branch belonged to an obscure line of descent of the Jeonju Yi clan, which had survived the often deadly political intrigue that frequently embroiled the Joseon court by forming no affiliations. Yi Ha-eung himself was ineligible for the throne due to a law that dictated that any possible heir had to be part of the generation after the most recent incumbent of the throne, but his second son Yi Myeong-bok (future Emperor Gojong), was a possible successor.

The Pungyang Jo clan saw that Yi Myeong-bok was only twelve years old and would not be able to rule in his own name until he came of age, and that they could easily influence Yi Ha-eung, who would be acting as regent for the future King. As soon as news of Cheoljong's death reached Yi Ha-eung through his intricate network of spies, he and the Pungyang Jo clan took the royal seal – an object that was considered necessary for a legitimate reign to take place and aristocratic recognition to be received – effectively giving Queen Sinjeong absolute power to select the successor to the throne. By the time Cheoljong's death had become a known fact, the Andong Kim clan was powerless according to the law.

On 16 January 1864, Yi Myeong-bok was appointed as Prince Ikseong by Grand Queen Dowager Sinjeong, and the next day, his father was granted the title of Grand Internal Prince (Daewongun).

A few days later on January 21, Yi Myeong-bok was enthroned as King Gojong, and Dowager Queen Sinjeong began her regency.

Since Gojong was 12 years old, Queen Sinjeong invited the Daewongun to assist his son in ruling. She virtually renounced her right to be regent, and though she kept the title, the Daewongun was in fact the true ruler.

The Queen Dowager Myeongsun had a futile 14-year reign as the Grand Internal Prince drove out and exterminated the Andong Kim clan's power, and soon after the power of the Pungyang Jo clan.

She later died on 12 June 1878 within Yanghwa Hall in Changgyeong Palace, and is buried in Yereung, Seoul, with her husband.

Family 
 Great-great-great-great-great-great-great-great-great-grandfather
 Kim Saeng-hae (김생해, 金生海)
 Great-great-great-great-great-great-great-great-grandfather
 Kim Geuk-hyo (김극효, 金克孝) (16 September 1542 - 3 February 1618)
 Great-great-great-great-great-great-great-great-grandmother
 Lady Jeong of the Dongnae Jeong clan (동래 정씨)
 Great-great-great-great-great-great-great-grandfather
 Kim Sang-gwan (김상관, 金尙觀)
 Great-great-great-great-great-great-grandfather
 Kim Gwang-chan (김광찬, 金光燦) (1597 - 24 February 1668)
 Great-great-great-great-great-great-grandmother
 Lady Kim of the Yeonan Kim clan (연안 김씨)
 Great-great-great-great-great-grandfather
 Kim Su-hang (김수항, 金壽恒) (1629 - 9 April 1689)
 Great-great-great-great-great-grandmother
 Lady Na of the Anjeong Na clan (안정 나씨)
 Great-great-great-great-grandfather
 Kim Chang-jib (김창집, 金昌集) (1648 - 2 May 1722)
 Adoptive Great-great-great-great-grandfather – Kim Chang-hyeob (김창협, 金昌協) (21 February 1651 - 30 May 1708)
 Great-great-great-great-grandmother
 Lady Park (박씨)
 Adoptive Great-great-great-great-grandmother – Lady Yi of the Yeonan Yi clan (연안 이씨); daughter of Yi Dan-sang (이단상, 李端相)
 Great-great-great-grandfather 
 Kim Je-gyeom (김제겸, 金濟謙)
 Adoptive Great-great-great-grandfather – Kim Sung-gyeom (김숭겸, 金崇謙) (28 November 1682 - 30 November 1700)
 Adoptive Great-great-great-grandmother – Lady Park (박씨) (21 May 1682 - 31 January 1733); daughter of Park Gwon (박권, 朴權)
 Great-great-grandfather
 Kim Won-haeng (김원행, 金元行) (14 February 1703 - 5 August 1772)
 Great-grandfather 
 Kim Yi-jik (김이직, 金履直)
 Grandfather
 Kim In-sun (김인순, 金麟淳)
 Grandmother
 Lady Shin (정부인 신씨, 貞夫人 申氏), Kim In-sun's third wife; daughter of Shin Il-sik (신일식, 申日式)
 Father
 Kim Mun-geun (김문근, 金汶根) (25 November 1801 - 6 November 1863)
 Uncle: Kim Su-geun (김수근, 金洙根) (1798 - 1854)
 Aunt: Lady Jo of the Pungyang Jo clan (정부인 풍양 조씨, 貞夫人 豐壤 趙氏); daughter of Jo Jin-taek (조진택, 趙鎭宅) 
 Cousin: Kim Byeong-hak (김병학, 金炳學) (1821 - 1879); adoptive son of Kim Jun-geun (김준근, 金浚根)  
 Cousin-in-law: Lady Yun of the Papyeong Yun clan (파평 윤씨)
 Cousin-in-law: Lady Yun of the Papyeong Yun clan (파평 윤씨)
 Cousin-in-law: Lady Yi of the Seongju Yi clan (성주 이씨)
 Adoptive first cousin: Kim Seung-gyun (김승규, 金昇圭); son of Kim Byeong-yu (김병유, 金炳儒)
 Cousin: Kim Byeong-guk (김병국, 金炳國) (1825 - 1905)
 Unnamed cousin-in-law
 Adoptive first cousin: Kim Jeong-gyun (김정균, 金貞均); son of Kim Byeong-mun (김병문, 金炳聞)
 Mother
 Biological: Internal Princess Consort Heungyang of the Yeoheung Min clan (흥양부부인 여흥 민씨, 興陽府夫人 驪興 閔氏) (? - 1872); Kim Mun-geun's second wife
 Grandfather: Min Mu-hyeon (민무현, 閔懋鉉)
 Step: Internal Princess Consort Yeonyang of the Yeonan Yi clan (연양부부인 연안 이씨, 延陽府夫人 延安 金氏) (1799 - 1824)
Sibling(s):
 Younger brother: Kim Byeong-pil (김병필, 金炳弼) (1839 - 1870)
 Nephew: Kim Heung-gyu (김흥규, 金興圭)
 Grandnephew: Kim Yong-jin (김용진, 金容鎭); adopted by Kim Jeong-gyu (김정규)
Husband:
King Cheoljeong of Joseon (25 July 1831 - 16 January 1864)
 Father-in-law: Yi Gwang, Grand Internal Prince Jeongye (전계대원군 이광, 全溪大院君 李㼅) (29 April 1785 - 14 December 1841)
 Legal father-in-law: King Sunjo of Joseon (순조, 純祖) (29 July 1790 - 13 December 1834)
 Mother-in-law: Grand Internal Princess Consort Yongseong of the Yongdam Eom clan (용성부대부인 염씨, 龍城府大夫人 廉氏) (20 July 1793 - March 1834)
 Legal mother-in-law: Queen Sunwon of the Andong Kim clan (순원왕후 김씨) (8 June 1789 - 21 September 1857)
Issue:
 Son: Prince Royal Yi Yung-jun (원자 융준, 元子 隆俊) (22 November 1858 - 25 May 1859)

Titles
 27 April 1837 – 12 June 1878: Lady Kim, daughter of Kim Mun-geun of the Andong Kim clan
Lady Kim (안동 김씨, 安東 金氏)
Kim Mun-geun's daughter (김문근의 딸, 金汶根之 女)
17 November 1851 – 16 January 1864: The Queen Consort of Joseon (조선 왕비, 朝鮮 王妃)
 16 January 1864 – 26 March 1866: The Queen Dowager of Joseon (조선 대비, 朝鮮 大妃)
 26 March 1866 – 12 June 1878: Queen Dowager Myeongsun (명순 대비, 明純 大妃)

Posthumous title
Joseon dynasty
Full formal title: Queen Myeongsun Hwiseong Jeong'won Suryeong Gyeongheon Jangmok Cheorin of Joseon (명순휘성정원수령경헌장목철인왕후; 明純徽聖正元粹寧敬獻莊穆哲仁王后)
Short informal title: Queen Cheorin (철인왕후; 哲仁王后)
Korean Empire
Full formal title: Empress Myeongsun Hwiseong Jeong'won Suryeong Gyeongheon Jangmok Cheorin Jang of the Korean Empire (명순휘성정원수령경헌장목철인장황후; 明純徽聖正元粹寧敬獻莊穆哲仁章皇后)
Short informal title: Empress Cheorin Jang (철인장황후; 哲仁章皇后)

In popular culture
 Portrayed by Jo Nam-gyeong in the 1982 KBS1 TV series Wind and Cloud
 Portrayed by Chae Yoo-mi in the 1990 MBC TV series Daewongun
 Portrayed by Yoo Hye-yeong in the 2001-2002 KBS TV series Empress Myeongseong 
 Portrayed by Shin Hye-sun in the 2020 tvN TV series Mr. Queen.

References

External links 
 http://www.guide2womenleaders.com/korea_heads.htm

19th-century Korean people
1837 births
1878 deaths
Andong Kim clan
Royal consorts of the Joseon dynasty
Korean queens consort
19th-century Korean women
Korean posthumous empresses